Nikolai Vogel (born 10 January 1971 in Munich) is a German writer.

Biography 

Nikolai Vogel was born in 1971 in Munich. He attended school in Landsberg am Lech. He studied German literature, philosophy and computer science at the Ludwig Maximilian University of Munich. Subsequently, he worked as a Web developer and writer. In 1993 he founded the start-up publishing house Black Ink Verlag together with Kilian Fitzpatrick. From 1996 to 2000 Vogel and Fitzpatrick organized the See-Lesungen (Readings on the Lake) at the Kleinhesseloher See in the Englischer Garten of Munich. In 2004, Vogel participated at the Open Mike of Berlin and the Ingeborg Bachmann Prize in Klagenfurt, Austria.

In 1997 Nikolai Vogel was awarded the Kulturförderpreis des Landkreises Landsberg/Lech and in 2007 he received the literary prize Bayerischer Kunstförderpreis.

Works 

 Und andere Untiefen, Scheuring 1993 (with Kilian Fitzpatrick and Christoph Schäferle)
 Plot, Scheuring 1995 (with Kilian Fitzpatrick)
 E. T. A. Hoffmanns Erzählung "Der Sandmann" als Interpretation der Interpretation, Frankfurt am Main 1998
 Mißlungene Texte, Scheuring 1998
 Qually, Scheuring 2000/2004
 Wandlung, Scheuring, 2000
 Welt II, Scheuring 2000 (with Kilian Fitzpatrick)
 Zwei Wochen, Scheuring 2002 (with Kilian Fitzpatrick)
 Der König schläft im Schloss, Scheuring 2007 (with Thomas Glatz and Kilian Fitzpatrick)

External links 
 Biography at publisher Black Ink
 Article from the Ingeborg-Bachmann-Preis 2005

1971 births
Living people
Writers from Munich
20th-century German novelists
21st-century German novelists
German male novelists
20th-century German male writers
21st-century German male writers